Fallen Angel of Doom.... is Blasphemy's first full-length album, released in 1990. The album is considered one of the most influential records for the war metal style (also known as war black metal or bestial black metal).

Reception 

Tom of Terrorizer magazine called the album "heavier than the entire forests of Canada falling on your big toe" and included it on the list of The Heaviest Albums Ever: The albums Kerrang! forgot.

Track listing

Personnel 
Caller of the Storms – lead guitar, sound effects
Traditional Sodomizer of the Goddess of Perversity – rhythm guitars, backing vocals, effects
Nocturnal Grave Desecrator and Black Winds – bass, lead vocals, effects
3 Black Hearts of Damnation and Impurity – drums

Release history

References

External links
 

1990 albums
Blasphemy (band) albums